Andrea Delcarro (born 25 March 1993) is an Italian professional footballer who plays as a midfielder for  club Rimini..

Club career
Born in Treviglio, Delcarro started his senior career for Rudianese in Serie D. He spent 10 seasons in Serie D.

On 17 July 2020, he signed for Serie C club Virtus Verona. He made his professional debut on 4 October 2020 against Imolese.

On 7 July 2021, he joined Ancona-Matelica.

On 8 July 2022, he moved to Rimini.

References

External links
 
 

1993 births
Living people
People from Treviglio
Footballers from Lombardy
Italian footballers
Association football midfielders
Serie C players
Serie D players
U.S.D. Caravaggio players
Clodiense S.S.D. players
Virtus Verona players
Ancona-Matelica players
Rimini F.C. 1912 players